Link cable may refer to:

 Game Link Cable
 GameCube – Game Boy Advance link cable
 PlayStation Link Cable